Marthin Kornbakk (born 13 February 1964) is a Swedish wrestler. He competed in the men's Greco-Roman 68 kg at the 1992 Summer Olympics.

References

1964 births
Living people
Swedish male sport wrestlers
Olympic wrestlers of Sweden
Wrestlers at the 1992 Summer Olympics
Sportspeople from Gothenburg